Deflektor  is a puzzle game developed by Vortex Software and published by Gremlin Graphics in 1987. In this game, the player has to rotate mirrors to deflect a beam in order to destroy all the cells of each level. There are also other devices the player has to be careful not to touch with the beam for too much time because otherwise the system will overload. The game was followed by a sequel in 1989 called Mindbender.

The game was also ported to the Japanese Sharp X68000 by Bullet-Proof Software.

A port for the Atari 8-bit family of computers was developed by Atari Corporation in 1988, but was not published.

According to the Deflektor X4 remake programmer Ignacio Pérez Gil, the Deflektor developer Costa Panayi endorsed the creation and distribution of the non-commercial open-source freeware in the 2000s.

Reception

Writing for Zzap! magazine in February, 1988, Julian Rignall wrote "Deflektor is very enjoyable, and provides an original and worthwhile way to kill time."

References

External links

Deflektor X4 : Authorised remake
Deflektor I : For Atari 8-bit
Deflektor II : For Atari 8-bit

1987 video games
Amiga games
Amstrad CPC games
Atari ST games
Cancelled Atari 8-bit family games
Commodore 64 games
NEC PC-9801 games
X68000 games
ZX Spectrum games
Puzzle video games
Blue Planet Software games
Gremlin Interactive games
Video games scored by Ben Daglish
Vortex Software games
Video games developed in the United Kingdom